A sulfonyl nitrene is a chemical compound with generic formula R-SO2N. Known sulfonyl nitrenes include methyl sulfonyl nitrene, trifluoromethyl sulfonyl nitrene, and tolyl sulfonyl nitrene. Also fluorosulfonyl nitrene FSO2N exists, but rearranges to FNSO2. Preparation of sulfonyl nitrenes can be by heating the sulfonyl azide, (RSO2N3.

They are distinct from sulfinyl nitrenes which only have one oxygen attached to the sulfur atom.

References

Nitrogen compounds
Sulfonyl groups